César Fernando Cabrera Bengzon (May 29, 1896 – September 3, 1992) was the Chief Justice of the Supreme Court of the Philippines from April 28, 1961 until May 29, 1966. In November 1966, a few months after his retirement, he became the first Filipino to be appointed to the International Court of Justice.

Judicial career
Bengzon earned his Bachelor of Arts degree from Ateneo de Manila in 1915. He graduated his Bachelor of Laws from the University of the Philippines in 1919, and placed second in the Bar Examinations that same year.

Starting out as a law clerk, he was promoted to Solicitor General in 1932 and Undersecretary of Justice under Governor-General (later U.S. Supreme Court Justice) Frank Murphy in 1933. He was later appointed in 1936 to the Court of Appeals, and became an Associate Justice of the Supreme Court in 1945. He left the Supreme Court in 1948 to become Secretary of Justice under President Elpidio Quirino, but was reinstated a few months later.

References
 Cesar Fernando Bengzon Baptismal Certificate
 Cruz, Isagani A. (2000). Res Gestae: A Brief History of the Supreme Court. Rex Book Store, Manila

1896 births
1992 deaths
Associate Justices of the Supreme Court of the Philippines
Ateneo de Manila University alumni
Chief justices of the Supreme Court of the Philippines
20th-century Filipino lawyers
International Court of Justice judges
Justices of the Court of Appeals of the Philippines
People from Tarlac
Quirino administration cabinet members
Secretaries of Justice of the Philippines
Solicitors General of the Philippines
University of the Philippines alumni
University of the Philippines College of Law alumni
Filipino judges of United Nations courts and tribunals